Spyro Gyra  is an American jazz fusion band that was formed in Buffalo, New York, in 1974. The band's music combines jazz, R&B, funk, and pop music. The band's name comes from Spirogyra, a genus of green algae which founder Jay Beckenstein had learned about in college.

History

Early years
Saxophonist Jay Beckenstein and keyboardist Jeremy Wall formed a band with jazz and rock musicians who were playing in the Buffalo bar and club circuit. In 1974, when a bar owner asked for the band's name, Beckenstein said, "spirogyra", a type of algae he had learned about in school. The bar owner wrote the name incorrectly, "Spyro Gyra", but it stuck. The founding members of the band were Beckenstein, Wall, bassist Jim Kurzdorfer, drummer Tom Walsh, and keyboardist Tom Schuman.  In 1977, they released Spyro Gyra independently before making a deal with Amherst Records, which re-released the album with a different cover. It included "Shaker Song," which reached No. 90 on Billboard's Hot 100, No. 99 on the pop chart in Canada, and No. 26 on the Canadian AC chart. Jay Beckenstein and Richard Calandra co-produced the record, while Beckenstein and Wall each wrote an equal number of compositions. After the success of "Shaker Song," the band went on tour in 1978 with a lineup including Beckenstein on sax, Wall and Schuman on keyboards, Kurzdorfer on bass, Freddy Rapillo on guitar, Eli Konikoff on drums and Gerardo Velez on percussion.

The band's second album Morning Dance reached No. 11 in the UK Albums Chart, No. 27 on the Billboard Top 200 albums chart, and No. 47 in Canada. The song "Morning Dance" reached No. 17 in the UK Singles Chart, No. 1 on the US Adult Contemporary singles chart, No. 45 on the Canadian pop charts, and No. 6 on the Canadian AC charts.  The album was certified gold in 1979, then platinum in 1987 by the RIAA. In addition to the band, the album featured guest musicians including trumpet player Randy Brecker, saxophonist Michael Brecker, guitarists John Tropea and Hiram Bullock, bassist Will Lee, drummer Steve Jordan and percussionist Rubens Bassini. Drummer Ted Reinhardt and guitarist Rick Strauss were in the band lineup during recording, but by the album's completion Chet Catallo joined on guitar. Jeremy Wall left the touring lineup but would continue to compose for the band. The sextet of Beckenstein, Schuman, Catallo, Kurzdorfer, Konikoff and Velez became the band's touring lineup in 1979, continuing into 1980.

1980's
When Infinity Records folded, Catching the Sun was released on MCA in February 1980, becoming the No. 4 jazz album of 1980, peaking at No. 31 in the UK, and No. 80 in Canada. This album included the first composition for the group by Tom Schuman, who would become a regular writer along with Beckenstein and Wall, while other band members also contributed compositions. Bassist Jim Kurzdorfer left the group in 1980, replaced by David Wofford, and for a tour of Japan Sheila Escovedo temporarily replaced Velez on percussion. The group released their next album, Carnaval, in late 1980. Catching the Sun was certified gold in 1985 by the RIAA, followed in 1987 by Carnaval. The group's next release was Freetime, in 1981.

Incognito (1982) featured as guests bassist Marcus Miller, drummer Steve Gadd, saxophonist Tom Scott, pianist Richard Tee, harmonica player Toots Thielemans, and pianist Jorge Dalto. City Kids (1983) introduced bassist Kim Stone, replacing Wofford. It was the first Spyro Gyra album recorded at BearTracks Studios, a studio in Suffern, NY established by Beckenstein in 1982.

The live album Access All Areas, recorded in Florida in November 1983, introduced marimba and vibraphone player Dave Samuels (who had guested on earlier tracks including the hits "Shaker Song" and "Morning Dance") as a full-time member of the band. After this album, Eli Konikoff and Chet Catallo left the group, to be replaced by drummer Richie Morales and guitarist Julio Fernández.

The new lineup (Beckenstein, Schuman, Fernández, Samuels, Stone, Morales and Velez) recorded 1985's Alternating Currents, the band's first studio album to feature only the core lineup with no guest musicians. After percussionist Manolo Badrena, formerly of Weather Report and a previous guest musician on Spyro Gyra's albums, joined the band as a full-time member, replacing Velez, the group released the 1986 follow-up Breakout. Alternating Currents (1985) and Breakout (1986) would be among the top 15 Jazz Albums in Billboard in 1986. Longtime co-producer Richard Calandra died in October 1986 of pancreatic cancer.

In 1987 Roberto Vally replaced Stone on bass for Stories Without Words, which would also be Manolo Badrena's final album with the band. Rites of Summer (1988) introduced bassist Oscar Cartaya, replacing Vally. Both Stories Without Words and Rites of Summer were among Billboard's top 15 Contemporary Jazz Albums of 1988. On the 1989 album Point of View Julio Fernández was replaced by guitarist Jay Azzolina. Spyro Gyra ended the decade as Billboard's most successful jazz artist of the 1980s.

1990's

Percussionist Marc Quiñones joined the group for  Fast Forward (1990), though it would be his only album with the band, and the last album for Richie Morales and Jay Azzolina. Guitarist Julio Fernández rejoined the band for two new tracks included on the "best of" album, Collection, which also marked the debut of drummer Joel Rosenblatt.

Three Wishes (1992) introduced bassist Scott Ambush, replacing Cartaya.  The following year's Dreams Beyond Control included guest appearances by former Santana vocalist Alex Ligertwood, marking the first appearance of lyrics on a Spyro Gyra album.  After this album, Dave Samuels left the band to pursue solo projects, although he would appear with the band on later albums.

In 1995, the band released Love and Other Obsessions with guests Deniece Williams, Barrington Henderson, Billy Cliff, and a host of other backing vocalists and musicians, including Dave Samuels. This album would be the band's final 90's release to feature traditional R&B vocals. It was the first of a series of albums with the quintet lineup of Beckenstein, Schuman, Fernández, Ambush and Rosenblatt, which lasted until 2004.

Recent years

Drummer Joel Rosenblatt left the band during the making of The Deep End, leaving room for two other drummers, guest Billy Kilson and Ludwig Afonso, who became Rosenblatt's replacement. The band's next album, 2006's Wrapped in a Dream, was the first Spyro Gyra album since 1990's Fast Forward to be nominated for a Grammy Award. It would be the band's final album recorded at BearTracks Studios, which Beckenstein closed in 2006. Trinidadian Bonny Bonaparte (Bonny B) replaced Afonso as drummer for Good to Go-Go (2007), which received a Grammy nomination, as did A Night Before Christmas and Down the Wire (2009).

A Foreign Affair was released in 2011 and included Beckenstein, Schuman, Fernández, Ambush, and Bonny B, as well as guest vocalists Arijit Singh and Keb' Mo'. The album debuted at No. 2 on the Billboard jazz album chart. Bonaparte left the group due to health issues in November 2011 and was replaced on drums by Lee Pearson.

The Rhinebeck Sessions (2013) included Beckenstein, Schuman, Fernandez, Ambush, and Pearson. According to the group, it was written and recorded over three days in a recording studio in Rhinebeck, New York. In 2015, there was another change of drummers with Lionel Cordew replacing Pearson. Vinyl Tap (2019), the band's most recent record to date, was a departure as it had no original material, instead featuring the band's interpretations of classic rock and r&b songs from the 60's and 70's.

In 2020, with the band forced to stop touring due to the COVID-19 pandemic, the band uploaded a video to YouTube on June 23, 2020 featuring a medley of early hits "Shaker Song," "Catching the Sun" and "Morning Dance" synchronized from recordings of each band member at home. In 2021, the group resumed touring.

On December 19, 2022, the band announced on Facebook that Tom Schuman planned to move to Europe and would play his final shows with the band in February 2023. On December 28, 2022, the band announced that Chris Fischer would be their new keyboardist starting in March 2023.

Former Members

Original bassist Jim Kurzdorfer died of cancer in 2011.

Former drummer Ted Reinhardt died in an airplane crash on March 4, 2015, at the age of 63.

Mallet player Dave Samuels died on April 22, 2019, due to an undisclosed long-term illness.

Original former guitarist Freddy Rapillo died on March 24, 2021.

Discography

Studio albums

Live albums

Compilations

Awards and nominations

Grammy nominations
 Best Jazz Fusion Performance: Catching the Sun (1980), Incognito (1982), City Kids (1983), Access All Areas (1984), Alternating Currents (1985)
 Best Pop Instrumental Performance: "Shakedown" (1985), "Simple Pleasures" (2008)
 Best Pop Instrumental Album: Wrapped in a Dream (2007), Good to Go-Go (2008), A Night Before Christmas (2009), Down the Wire (2010)
 Best Rhythm & Blues Instrumental Performance: "Stripes" (1982)

Other awards
 George Benson Lifetime Achievement Award, Canadian Smooth Jazz Awards (2007)

References

External links
 Official website
 
 

American jazz ensembles from New York (state)
Jazz fusion ensembles
Smooth jazz ensembles
Musical groups established in 1974
GRP Records artists
Windham Hill Records artists
Heads Up International artists
Musical groups from Buffalo, New York